Muggleton is a surname of English origin. People with the surname include:

 Amanda Muggleton (born 1951), Australian actress
 Andrew Muggleton (born 1974), English cricketer
 Brian Muggleton (born 1941), Australian cricketer
 Carl Muggleton (born 1968), English footballer
 John Muggleton (born 1960), Australian rugby league player
 Josh Muggleton (born 1989), a participant in the British television series Yeardot
 Lodowicke Muggleton (1609–1698), English religious leader
 Louis Muggleton (1922–2015), South African born British physicist and engineer
 Sam Muggleton (born 1995), English footballer
 Stephen Muggleton (born 1959), British computer scientist